Caldazinha is a municipality in central Goiás state, Brazil. The population was 3,848 (2020) in a total area of 312 km2.

Located 27 kilometers from the state capital, Goiânia, Caldazinha belongs to the Goiânia Microregion. Connections are made by GO-403 / passing through Senador Canedo.

Municipal boundaries are:
north:  Bonfinópolis and Leopoldo de Bulhões
west:  Senador Canedo
south:  Bela Vista de Goiás.

Demographic and political facts
(All data are from 2007 unless otherwise mentioned)

Caldazinha's population distribution is characterized by an almost equal distribution between urban and rural inhabitants.
Population density: 10.13 inhabitants/km2
Population growth rate 2000/2007: 2,06.%
Urban population: 1,739
Rural population: 1,418
Eligible voters: 2,532
City government: mayor (Jucelino Braz de Castro), vice-mayor (Paulo Roberto de Oliveira), and 09 councilmembers

Economy
The main economic activity of Caldazinha is cattle raising (25,300 head—5,330 milking cows). Some residents have been investing in the commercialization of paca meat, which although considered expensive, has been finding its niche in the market. There is also a small factory producing leather goods for farm use.

Other agricultural products are honey, bananas, oranges, rice, sugarcane, manioc, and corn (700 hectares). Source: IBGE

financial institutions: none
retail establishments: 16
industrial units: 06

Health
Infant mortality rate in 2000: 24.80
Hospitals: 0
Public health clinics: 01 (IBGE 2007

Education
Literacy rate in 2000: 87.8
schools: 04
classrooms: 30
teachers: 45
students: 1,017
higher education: none (IBGE 2006)

Human Development Index:  0.742
State ranking:  98 (out of 242 municipalities)
National ranking:  2,090 (out of 5,507 municipalities)

See also
List of municipalities in Goiás

References

Frigoletto

Municipalities in Goiás